The Sturmgewehr 57 is a selective fire battle rifle designed by Schweizerische Industrie Gesellschaft (now SAN Swiss Arms) of Switzerland. It uses a roller-delayed blowback system similar to the H&K G3 and CETME rifles.
The AM 55 entered service in the Swiss Army with the designation F. ass. 57 7.5mm (French/Italian, for Fusil d'Assaut/Fucile d'Assalto 1957) or 7.5mm Stgw. 57 (German for Sturmgewehr 1957), with export variations constituting the SG 510 family of small arms. 

The Sturmgewehr 57 was adopted for Swiss military service in 1957 and replaced in 1990 by the lighter SIG SG 550 assault rifle, although some reservists used it for several more years.

Design details
The Stgw. 57 was developed during the late 1950s, internally named AM 55 at SIG. During its development, Rudolf Amsler was the principal designer at Schweizerische Industrie Gesellschaft. It is a selective fire rifle that employs a roller-delayed blowback operating system. The Stgw. 57 was used by the Swiss Army as a personal universal weapon. In Swiss service, it gradually replaced the K31 rifle, the Suomi M-31/Mp. 43/Mp. 44 submachine gun, the Lmg 25 light machine gun, and after 1974-1977 the Zf. Kar. 55 designated marksman rifle.

Features

The weapon is mainly made of pressed sheet-metal components to ease mass production and incorporates the "straight-line" recoil configuration. This layout, placed both the center of gravity and the position of the shoulder stock nearly in line with the longitudinal axis of the bore, a feature increasing controllability during burst or automatic fire. The Stgw. 57 has a distinctive T-shaped bolt handle similar to the earlier K31 rifle.

As with all roller-delayed designs, the roller recesses and rollers in the receiver will eventually wear down, decreasing the bolt head to bolt carrier gap. Many roller-delayed blowback weapons accept this as the functional service life of the rifle, but the Stgw. 57 has interchangeable locking recesses, so they can be replaced when worn.  

The solid neoprene rubber, fixed butt-stock was designed with durability in mind and dynamically deforms to cope with the recoil produced by heavy rifle grenades. The Stgw. 57 sports a large carrying handle at its balance point that can be used during quick position changes or on the march. The ribbed handguard of the Stgw. 57 is also molded out of solid neoprene rubber.

Barrel
The Stgw. 57's barrel is relatively thick and rifled along  of its  length and has a 270 mm (1 in 10.6 in) 4 groove rifling.
A rifle grenade-launching interface is also integrally machined into the body of the barrel. 

The barrel is surrounded by a perforated tubular aluminium barrel jacket with two spring detents for a sliding, underfolding integrated bipod—one near the muzzle to reduce shot dispersion during automatic fire, and another nearer the receiver and balance point offering more flexibility in the rifle role.
The Stgw. 57 bipod legs are marked for use as an inclinometer for aiming rifle grenades at various ranges with and without an additional booster-charged rifle grenade. For such indirect rifle grenade fire, the Stgw. 57 was set on the ground and a weighted string attached on the sling loop was used as a plumb-line to set the correct firing angle reference mark on the appropriate bipod leg (left for boosted, right for unboosted). Swiss army knives were used as a makeshift plumb bob at the end of a string.

Trigger mechanism
The trigger mechanism has a three-position fire selector switch that is also the manual safety toggle that secures the weapon from accidentally discharging. The user selects the operating mode with a large side lever on the left side of the trigger pack that can be rotated to select S (safe), E (semi-automatic fire) or M (full-automatic fire).

On the right hand side of the rifle, there is a foldaway 'winter' trigger which enables the operator to use the rifle with arctic mittens. It is also used for rifle grenade firing to avoid recoil-induced hand injuries.

Sights

The Stgw. 57 has a straight-line stock design, and an elevated iron sights line with a relatively long  sight radius. Both the front and rear sights can be folded down when not in use.
From  the sight adjusts in  increments.

For low-visibility use, a reversible clip-on diopter with two self-luminous tritium-powered inserts (later carbon-14, one-side only) fitted laterally on each side of the aperture was issued. This element could be clipped by the user on the standard diopter. The front sight hood contained a permanently attached single strontium-90 or  tritium-powered insert above the post to complete the low visibility sight line. When not in use, the low-light diopter is stored inside the pistol grip cavity, with two blister packets of weapon grease. The useful life expectancy of tritium-illuminated night sight inserts is roughly 7-10 years.

According to the Swiss Army, the 50% windage and elevation dispersion shot at 300 m from a machine rest averages 6 cm (2.4 in). The employed circular error probable method cannot be converted and is not comparable to US military methods for determining rifle accuracy. When the R50 results are doubled the hit probability increases to 93.7%.

For designated marksman use, some special variants of the Stgw. 57 can be equipped with a quick-detachable Kern & Co Aarau 4×24 telescopic sight. The sight weighs  and includes a variety of features, such as a Bullet Drop Compensation (BDC) elevation adjustment knob for ranges from 100 to 800 m, a tritium-illuminated reticle that enables target acquisition in low-light conditions and a diopter eyesight correction adjustment. Included with the sight is a lens hood with additional protective lens and a gray filter for glare reduction. A night vision sight with an infrared light can also be mounted. The Chilean version can fit a German-made Supra 4×24 telescopic sight.

Accessories

The Stgw. 57 is fed from curved detachable box magazines, made from aluminum and containing 24 rounds weighing  empty and  fully loaded.
Special silver-colored magazines that can contain 6 grenade-launching cartridges (Gw. Treib.-Pat. 44) for use with rifle grenades weigh  empty and  fully loaded.
The Stgw. PE-57 had 6-round magazines available as well.
Magazines with 20-round capacities for the SG 510-4 in 7.62 NATO and 30-round originally for the Lmg. 25 may operate in the Stgw. 57 as well.
Other accessories include a leather sling, a bayonet, various magazine pouches, cavalry holsters, and fortress-firing kits. 

Rocket-boosted rifle grenades can be launched with the use of the aforementioned silver-colored magazine. Grenade-launching cartridges enable the Stgw. 57 to fire Gewehrgranaten 58 rifle grenades which weigh  depending on the warhead type.
Rifle grenade variants include: 
 Gw. HPz. G. 58: Hollow charge for heavy armor (direct-fire only), rated for ca. 280-320mm of penetration in rolled homogenous armor.
 Gw. St. G. 58: Anti-personnel fragmentation with impact detonator (direct or indirect-fire).
 Gw. Nb. G. 58: Smoke canister for reducing visibility (direct or indirect-fire).
 Gw. UG 58: Practice (inert orange rubber), with or without booster charge.

Accuracy potential
The following tables list accuracy statistics for typical in service Stgw. 57 rifles firing 7.5×55mm Swiss GP 11 service ammunition obtained by average marksman. The statistics were computed under the 1950's Swiss method for determining accuracy, which is more complex than Western methods which usually involve firing a group of shots and then measuring the overall diameter of the group. The Swiss method differs in that after a group of shots is fired into the target from a machine rest hits on the outer part of the target are disregarded, while only half of the hits on the inner part of the circles are counted (50% or R50), which significantly reduces the overall diameter of the groups. The vertical and horizontal measurements of the reduced groups are then used to measure accuracy. This circular error probable method used by the Swiss and other European militaries cannot be converted and is not comparable to US military methods for determining rifle accuracy. When the R50 results are doubled the hit probability increases to 93.7%.

 R50 means the closest 50 percent of the shot group will all be within a circle of the mentioned diameter.
 R93.7 means the closest 93.7 percent of the shot group will all be within a circle of the mentioned diameter.
 The single shot dispersion was determined from the bipod in the rear position.
 The 4-6 shot sort burst dispersion determined from the more stable bipod at the front position.

The radius of a circle is half its diameter.

Civilian use
Upon completion of their military service, members of the Swiss armed forces could obtain ownership of their personal Stgw. 57 rifle by paying an administrative fee. These "civilianised" Stgw. 57 rifles were converted to a semi-automatic only configuration. Dedicated factory-built, semi-automatic only rifles for private purchase were available and designated PE-Stgw. 57, PE means Privat Einzelfeuer ("private single fire"). These civilian rifles incorporate subtle design changes to avoid some cross-compatibility with army rifle parts. As of 2007, around 40 percent of discharged soldiers choose to retain their weapon (nowadays the SIG SG 550), and the going rate for civilianised Stgw. 57 rifles on the private weapons market is reported to vary between 300 and 500 Swiss francs.

In Switzerland, the Stgw. 57 is also used for target shooting matches. For this the standard iron sights can be replaced by target shooting diopter and globe sight sighting lines. When the original sighting is kept Swiss sport shooters refer to a such unmodified rifle as Stgw. 57/02 (small diopter allowed, but no globe sight). When a globe sight is added and possibly the sighting line radius is lengthened by mounting the globe sight nearer to the muzzle it is referred to as Stgw. 57/03. As of 2017, original military barrels, which are known for longevity and are rated for up to 15,000 rounds (for later nitrided variants), could be replaced by match-grade barrels. Other upgrades include improved target sights, mirage bands, lighter hammers, custom pistol grips, custom barrel jackets and regular replacement of bolt components.

SG 510-4 (7.62×51mm NATO variant) 

The SG 510-4 chambered in 7.62×51mm NATO was adopted by Chile and Bolivia. Compared to the SG 510-1, the following main changes were applied:

 Lighter, shorter (505mm) barrel with 8 (early), or 16 (late) chamber flutes, 304.8mm (1 in 12 inch) twist rate
 Revised delay angle on the bolt carrier wedge
 Straight 20-round box magazine with feed path insert to accommodate for the shorter cartridge
 New low-profile iron sights, with ramp-adjustable rear sight aperture and semi-hooded front sight
 Spring-loaded detent on the front barrel jacket bushing/front sight base for rifle grenade sight
 Angled stock tube and stock assembly, with correspondingly modified recoil spring assembly and bolt carrier tail
 Walnut wood stock and handguard
 New pistol grip design (after ca. 1966)
 Lightened roller recesses and winter trigger
 Simplified bolt carrier with add-on, unified rubber buffer and charging handle lug

The SG 510-4 is officially classed as an automatic rifle but also served as a designated marksman weapon (in Chile with Supra 4×24 scope)

Variants
 AM 55: Original version as adopted by the Swiss Army as "7,5mm Stgw. 57".
 SG 510-1: Export model of the AM 55 chambered in 7.62x51mm NATO. 
 SG 510-2: Lightened variant of the SG 510-1.
 SG 510-3: 7.62×39mm variant with shorter barrel, receiver and barrel jacket. This was produced in small numbers as a prototype and submitted to the Finnish Army. This model of the rifle was never mass-produced. 
 SG 510-4: 7.62×51mm NATO variant used by Bolivia and Chile. This version uses a shorter barrel and a buttstock made from wood rather than rubber. Overall length is much less than the Stgw 57 with a subsequently lower weight. The buttstock and stock tube are angled downward rather than straight inline with the receiver.
 SG 510-5: .30-06 Springfield (7.62×63mm) experimental rifle made for testing by the Mexican Government.
 SG 510-6: 7.5×55mm Swiss test batch of rifles based on the SG 510-4 in the Swiss military chambering intended to replace the heavier Stgw 57. The rifles were only built for testing and were no longer considered after 1980s trials.
 SG 510-7 T / SIG-AMT: semi-automatic only variant of the SG 510-4 imported into the United States in relatively small numbers. It was available in .308 (7.62×51). "AMT", term used after 1969, stood for "American Match Target". It was equipped with fine wooden furniture and could be ordered with a rounded upper handguard.
 Gewehr 2 (G2): 7.62×51mm NATO variant procured by the Bundeswehr for trials in 1956, which eventually lost to what would become Heckler & Koch G3.
 PE-Stgw. 57: (Privat Einzelfeuer) semi-automatic only civilian version of the AM 55 available in 7.5×55mm GP 11 Swiss. This variant is not the same as privatized former Swiss Army service rifles. It was specifically built as a semi auto only rifle along the lines of the Stgw. 57 with which it is frequently confused. While over 700,000 of the Stgw. 57s were built for military use, less than 5000 PE-Stgw. 57s were made.

Users

: SG 510-4 variant.
: Used by the Compagnie des Carabiniers du Prince.
: Adopted by the Swiss Army in 1957.

Gallery

See also 
SIG MG 710-3
SIG AK53
Sturmgewehr 52

References

External links

Modern Firearms
Biggerhammer.net
Schiessschule Walenstadt 
Swissrifles.com
Gunco.net
Exordinanza.net
Euroarms.net
Starting portal for articles, information and manuals, etc. on the Stgw 57/SG 510/AMT and SG 550 rifle series

7.5×55mm Swiss firearms
7.62×51mm NATO battle rifles
Rifles of the Cold War
Rifles of Switzerland
Roller-delayed blowback firearms
Military equipment introduced in the 1950s
SIG Sauer rifles